Arno Fischer (Wedding, Berlin, 14 April 1927 – Neustrelitz, 13 September 2011) was a German photographer and university teacher.

Life

Early years and war
Arno Fischer's father worked as a type setter. Arno attended school locally from 1933 till 1941 when he started training in aspects of carpentry (wood carving/modelling, pattern making). On reaching 17 he joined the army in 1944/45 concluding his military career as a prisoner of war held by the British, who released him in 1946.

A lengthy training in sculpture
He was able to resume his civilian life in 1947, studying at the Käthe Kollwitz art school in Berlin where initially he attended drawing classes before switching to (wood) sculpture. He moved on in 1948 to Berlin's Weißensee Arts Academy where he continued with his study of sculpture and where he remained till 1951. By this time the political division of Berlin between the eastern part, which was administered by the Soviets and the western parts of the city, divided into three sectors controlled respectively by the French, the British and the Americans, was looking more permanent than had been widely anticipated a few years earlier, and the move to Weißensee involved a move from West Berlin to East Berlin. He moved on again in 1951, and from then till 1953 he was a student at the (recently renamed) Weißensee Academy of Art Berlin back in West Berlin, studying sculpture under Alexander Gonda.
<div style="float: right; margin: 0 0 0.5em 1em; width: 47.5em; text-align: center; font-size: 0.81em; font-family: lucida grande, sans-serif; line-height: normal;">
<div style="border: 1px solid #999999; background: #ffffff; text-align: center; padding: 1em 1em; text-align: center;"> Major exhibitions
<div style="border: 1px solid #999999; background: #ffffff; text-align: left; padding: 1em 1em; text-align: left;">
Solo Exhibitions:
 1985: Fotogalerie Friedrichshain, Berlin, Fotografien aus vier Jahrzehnten
 1995: Laurence Miller Gallery, New York City, Berlin – Before the Wall
 1996: Vidéothèque de Paris, Paris, Frankreich, Arno Fischer
 1997: Staatliche Galerie Moritzburg, Halle/Saale, Arno Fischer. Photographien
 1998: Galerie Zimmer, Düsseldorf, Arno Fischer. Ost-West-Berlin und andere Photographien 1943–1990
 2000: Haus der Fotografie, Hannover, Arno Fischer. Photographien 1943–1989
 2002: Literaturforum in the Brecht House (Berlin)
 2002: Galerie Rosenkranz, Chemnitz, Arno Fischer. Der Garten
 2005: Galerie argus fotokunst, Berlin, New York Ansichten 1978 und 1984
 2006: Galeria Miejska we Wroclawiu, Wroclaw; Centrum Kultury Zamek, Galeria "pf" Poznan, Polen, Arno Fischer. Fotografie
 2006: Comptoir-Kunstmagazin – Städtische Galerie, Sonneberg, Arno Fischer. New York. Fotografien 1978/1984
 2007: Leonhardi Museum Dresden, Arno Fischer. Der Garten
 2007: Galerie argus fotokunst, Berlin, Arno Fischer. Portraitfotografien
 2007: Pankow Gallery, Berlin, Arno Fischer. Am Wege. Fotografie
 2008: Stiftung Moritzburg – Kunstmuseum des Landes Sachsen-Anhalt, Arno Fischer. Der Garten
 2009: Robert Morat Galerie, Hamburg, Arno Fischer. Der Garten
 2009: Kunst- und Ausstellungshalle der Bundesrepublik Deutschland; Diesel Power Arts Museum, Cottbus; Eine Ausstellung des Instituts für Auslandsbeziehungen e. V.; Arno Fischer. Retrospektive
 2010/2011: Berlinische Galerie – Fotografien 1953–2006. Hannah Höch Prize 2010
 2010/2011: Hall of Exhibitions, Salamanca/Spanien; Kunstmuseum, Santander/Spanien; Eine Ausstellung des Institute for Foreign Cultural Connections
 2012: Muzeum Historii Fotografii w Krakowie/Museum für Geschichte der Fotografie Krakau; Eine Ausstellung des Institute for Foreign Cultural Connections
 2012/16.  – 9 August. September : "ARNO FISCHER – Besuchen" in der Galerie SPRECHSAAL (Berlin – Mitte).
 2012: Staatliches Museums- und Ausstellungszentrum ROSFOTO St. Petersburg; Eine Ausstellung des Institute for Foreign Cultural Connections

Joint Exhibitions:
 1982: Ausstellungszentrum am Fučíkplatz, Dresden, Kunstausstellung der DDR
 1984: Altes Museum, Berlin, Alltag und Epoche. Werke bildender Kunst der DDR aus fünfunddreißig Jahren
 1986: Staatliche Kunstsammlungen, Cottbus, Fotografie in der Kunst der DDR
 1987: Arles, Frankreich, Fotofestival Les Rencontres Internationales de la Photographie
 1990: Braga, Portugal, Fotofestival Encontros da imagem
 1991: Friedrich-Naumann-Stiftung, Königswinter (mit Ulrich Wüst)
 1991: Centro Andaluz de la Fotograia, Almeria, Spanien, Imagina. Proyecto en torno a la otograia,
 1991: Centre Régional de la Photographie Nord, Pas-de-Calais, Douchy-les-Mines Frankreich Berlin 1943–1990 d‘Arno Fischer
 1992: Berlinische Galerie, Landesmuseum für Moderne Kunst, Fotografie und Architektur, Berlin, Nichts ist so einfach wie es scheint. Ostdeutsche Photographie 1945–1989
 1992–1999: Tourneeausstellung des Instituts für Auslandsbeziehungen e. V., (ifa) in 16 Ländern und 33 Städten, Zustandsberichte. Deutsche Fotografie der 50er bis 80er Jahre in Ost und West
 1993: Lissabon, Portugal, Fotofestival Mês da Fotograia
 1997: Berlinische Galerie, Landesmuseum für Moderne Kunst, Fotografie und Architektur, Berlin, Positionen künstlerischer Photographie in Deutschland seit 1945
 1998: Galerie am Fischmarkt, Erfurt, Signaturen des Sichtbaren – Ein Jahrhundert der Fotografie in Deutschland
 1999: Kunstverein Ludwigshafen am Rhein, Zwischen Abstraktion und Wirklichkeit – Fotografie der 50er Jahre
 2000: Fotogalerie Friedrichshain, Berlin, Fünfzehn Jahre Fotografie
 2002: Berlinische Galerie, Landesmuseum für Moderne Kunst, Fotografie und Architektur, Berlin Paarungen – Künstlerische Positionen im Dialog
 2003: Galerie für Zeitgenössische Kunst Leipzig, Öffentlich Privat. Das Bild des Privaten in der deutschen Nachkriegsfotografie
 2004: Théâtre de la Photographie et de l‘Image, Nizza, Frankreich, La photographie allemande
 2004: Wohnung Schiffbauerdamm 12, Berlin, Finissage. Abschied vom Schiffbauerdamm
 2005: Willy-Brandt-Haus, Berlin, Utopie und Wirklichkeit – Ostdeutsche Fotografie 1956–1989
 2006: Mori Art Museum, Tokio, Japan; Neue Nationalgalerie, Staatliche Museen zu Berlin, Preußischer Kulturbesitz, Berlin, Tokio-Berlin/Berlin-Tokio – Die Kunst zweier Städte
 2006: Robert Morat Galerie, Hamburg, Sibylle Bergemann. Arno Fischer. Photographien
 2006: Städtische Galerie, Sonneberg, Sibylle Bergemann. Arno Fischer. Photographien'
 2007: Cornerhouse Manchester – International Centre for Contemporary Visual Arts and Film, Manchester; University of Hertfordshire Galleries, Hatield, Großbritannien, Do Not Refreeze. Photography behind the Berlin Wall 2008: Edition Braus Wachter Verlag Galerie, Heidelberg, Menschenbilder. Sibylle Bergemann, Arno Fischer 2008: Kunst-Raum im Deutschen Bundestag, Berlin, Von Kunst und Politik. Fotografie in der Sammlung des Deutschen Bundestages 2008: Focal Point Gallery, Southend-on-Sea, Großbritannien, Do Not Refreeze – Photography Behind the Berlin Wall 2008: Städelsches Kunstinstitut und Städtische Galerie, Frankfurt a. M., REAL – Aus der Sammlung der DZ BANK 2009: Los Angeles County Museum of Art, Los Angeles, USA/Germanisches Nationalmuseum, Nürnberg; Deutsches Historisches Museum, Berlin, Art of Two Germanys/Cold War Cultures; Kunst und Krieg/Deutsche Positionen 1945–89  2009: Akademie der Künste, Berlin, Kunst und Revolte ‚89. Übergangsgesellschaft. Porträts und Szenen 1980–1990 2010: Eros und Stasi. Ostdeutsche Fotografie Sammlung Gabriele Koenig. Ludwig Forum für Internationale Kunst, Aachen
 Kunst- und Ausstellungshalle der Bundesrepublik, Deutschland, Bonn, Deutsche Fotografie. Macht eines Mediums. 1870–1970 7. Internationale Fototage Mannheim/Ludwigshafen, Die Kunst, Deutsche(r) zu sein</div></div></div>

Photography
Later Fischer recalled that he took his first photograph in 1944, of Berlin burning as Germany's defeat in the war loomed. He never received any formal training in photography; but nor, after 1944, did he ever lose his interest in it, and as his studies progressed he became aware that he was unlikely ever to make much money out of sculpture. His move into the world of photography started in 1955/56 with a year as a laboratory assistant at an X-ray institute. In 1956 he returned to the Arts Academy in Weißensee with a mandate to set up an archive, work as a general assistant, and "take photographs". By 1957, still without any formal photographic training, he had a job with The Academy as Senior Assistant to Prof. Klaus Wittkugel, a position he retained till 1971.

In addition he undertook photo-journalistic assignments for the fashion and arts women's magazine Sibylle and for other periodicals. His growing body of fashion and travel photography from the second part of the 1950s were set firmly in the new "Life photography" mainstream.  Fischer later said that the focus of his photography work was on the condition of society, the interpersonal relationships of people, the core condition of the individual and his/her existence. These features are abundantly evident in "Situation Berlin", another project on which he worked between 1953 and 1960. By 1960 he was working very intensively on preparing for publication by "Edition Leipzig" of the resulting collection, evoking the moods and sights of the rapidly changing city in the 1950s.  Pictures from the book, by now fully written and prepared for launch, were on display on the publisher's stand at the Leipzig Book Fair in the Autumn of 1961.  The fair was held very shortly after the government had suddenly started their feverish construction of the Berlin Wall which for the next (nearly) three decades would cut off East Berlin from the west. A group of officials stopped off at the publisher's stand to look at some of the pictures on display under the "Situation Berlin" banner. One said to the others the chilling words, "Berlin ist kein Situation mehr" ("Berlin is no longer a situation"''). The reference was to the way that the exodus of East Germans to the west through Berlin had been blocked by the new wall, but the meaning for Arno Fischer and his publishers was that "Situation Berlin" was not going to be published within foreseeable time.

Middle years
Arno Fischer was once asked whether in the wake of his experience with "Situation Berlin" he was ever tempted to try and escape from East Germany, but while he sometimes found the country's bureaucratic constraints limiting, he was generally accepting of the situation in which he found himself. A change of managing editor at "Sibylle" gave him freedom to develop, apply and promote his own ideas on fashion photography while status as a distinguished photo-journalist gave him excellent travel entitlements:  some of his most celebrated fashion/celebrity shots, notably a set taken of Marlene Dietrich in 1964, were taken while traveling on assignment in Moscow.   In 1965/66 he and a like minded group of East German photographers founded a Photographers' Group which in 1969 became known as "Direkt". Mutual acceptance of and by the establishment was also evident in the guest lectureship which he held in 1972/74 at the Higher Academy for Visual Arts (HGB / Hochschule für Grafik und Buchkunst) at Leipzig. From 1975 till 1982, together with Peter Voigt he was responsible for selecting the photographs shown on the Image Display Pillars flanking the Marx-Engels Forum which contained Ludwig Engelhardt's politically important Marx Engels Memorial. In 1981 Fischer was involved in the co-founding of the Photographers' Working Group in the national Visual Artists' Association (VBK) and 1983 he took a teaching contract back at the HGB where between 1985 and 1993 he held a position as Professor for Photographic Arts.

Changes
Changes experienced during the built up to reunification and its aftermath brought upheaval to the world of women's fashion magazines: Sibylle, after staggering on for a few more years, finally ran out of money in 1995. More positively, Fischer's international reputation was no longer constricted by the political isolationism of the old German Democratic Republic. With his wife, he involved himself in "Almediterrana 92" a major photographic project in Spain, and his work was increasingly exhibited across and beyond Germany. "Situation Berlin" was finally published in 2001. On the teaching front, Fischer took a lectureship in photographic journalism at the University of Applied Sciences and Arts in Dortmund, which he retained till 2000, and there was also a new teaching contract at Leipzig in 1993.

Personal
In 1985 Fischer married Sibylle Bergemann, a former student who by this time was developing a formidable reputation of her own as a photographer.

At the end Arno Fischer would predecease his wife by just fifty days.

Public awards
 1986 National Prize of East Germany
 2000 Dr. Erich Salomon Award from the German Society for Photography
 2010 Hannah Höch Prize for a lifetime of artistic accomplishment

References

German photojournalists
Fashion photographers
Academic staff of the Weißensee Academy of Art Berlin
1927 births
2011 deaths
People from Mitte
Photographers from Berlin